Millard Fillmore Caldwell (February 6, 1897 – October 23, 1984) was an American politician, lawyer, and jurist. He was the 29th governor of Florida (1945–1949) and served in all three branches of government at various times in his life, including as a U.S. representative and Florida Supreme Court justice.

Early life
Caldwell was born in the rural area of Beverly, Tennessee, outside Knoxville. There he attended public schools and attended Carson-Newman College, the University of Mississippi, and the University of Virginia. During World War I, Caldwell enlisted in the U.S. Army on April 3, 1918. He was commissioned as a second lieutenant in the Field Artillery, and was discharged on January 11, 1919. Caldwell moved to Milton, Florida in 1924, practicing law there.

Career

Early career 
In 1926, Caldwell began serving as prosecutor and county attorney of Santa Rosa County; in 1929, he was elected as a Democrat to the state House, where he was a member until 1932.

US Congress and gubernatorial interim 
Caldwell would enter the 1932 Democratic primary late for Florida's 3rd Congressional District. In the end he would end up defeating Tom Yon and in congress he would serve as a member on two committees: Foreign Affairs and Appropriations. While serving in Congress he would urge that the US be self-sufficient for its war resources by 1934. He would unsuccessfully try to place an embargo on shipments to Japan and he did advocate for expanding both the Navy and Army. He would retire from Congress on January 1, 1941, and move to Tallahassee where he would practice law along with operate a dairy and raise cattle.

Governorship 
In 1944, Caldwell was elected governor of Florida. Taking office in 1945, Caldwell's term is noted for his segregationist beliefs, as well as his support for road construction projects and the establishment of the Educational Minimum Foundation Program, which gave education funds to rural counties. One of the more colorful aspects of Caldwell's term came on August 10, 1945, during the surrender of Japan in World War II, when Caldwell issued a proclamation urging bars and other alcohol-selling establishments to close in order to prevent a frenzy of drunken celebration in the streets.

Caldwell would support Harry S. Truman's run for president in 1948 as many Southern Democrats had left the party.

Post-governorship activities 
After leaving office in 1949, Caldwell was appointed the administrator of the Federal Civil Defense Administration by then-President Harry S. Truman in 1950. After leaving this post in 1952, Caldwell served as a justiceand later chief justiceon the State Supreme Court from 1962 to 1969.

On May 14, 1953, Caldwell was initiated as an honorary brother in the Alpha Phi chapter of Alpha Kappa Psi at the University of Florida

Death
Caldwell died in Tallahassee on October 23, 1984. He is interred at Blackwood-Harwood Plantations Cemetery  in Leon County in Tallahassee, Florida.

Personal life 
Caldwell was married to Mary Harwood Caldwell; the couple's three children were Susan, Millard, and Sally.

During his life, Caldwell was a member of the Newcomen Society, Freemasons, Shriners, Elks, and Knights of Pythias. He was also a member of Kappa Sigma and Phi Alpha Delta.

See also
 List of governors of Florida

References

External links
 
 Biographical Directory of the United States Congress
 

|-

|-

|-

|-

1897 births
1984 deaths
20th-century American judges
United States Army personnel of World War I
American prosecutors
Carson–Newman University alumni
Democratic Party governors of Florida
Democratic Party members of the United States House of Representatives from Florida
Justices of the Florida Supreme Court
Politicians from Knoxville, Tennessee
University of Mississippi alumni
University of Virginia alumni
People from Milton, Florida
Democratic Party members of the Florida House of Representatives
20th-century American politicians